Richard E. Cameron (May 29, 1925–March 11, 2009) was an American politician who served for two terms as a Republican member of the Kansas House of Representatives, from 1979 to 1982. He represented the 47th District in the Kansas House for his first term, followed by one term in the 48th district, and resided in Atchison, Kansas.

References

1925 births
2009 deaths
Republican Party members of the Kansas House of Representatives
People from Atchison, Kansas
20th-century American politicians